Stinker Point is a headland  south of Table Bay and  northwest of Piperkov Point on the west coast of Elephant Island, in the South Shetland Islands of Antarctica. It was mapped by the UK Joint Services Expedition to Elephant Island, 1970–71, and named after the southern giant petrels which breed there, "stinker" being an old sailors' name for the bird.

Important Bird Area
The point is part of the Point Wordie Important Bird Area, identified as such by BirdLife International because of its importance as a breeding site for seabirds, especially chinstrap penguins.

References

Headlands of the South Shetland Islands
Elephant Island
Important Bird Areas of Antarctica
Penguin colonies
Seabird colonies